Donna McCloy ( Donna McNally, born 2 September 1972) is a Northern Irish international lawn bowler.

Bowls career

International
McNally won the triples gold medal at the 1999 Atlantic Bowls Championships with Margaret Johnston and Dorothy Kane. Six years later she won the fours bronze medal at the 2005 Atlantic Championships.

She then won the bronze medal in the fours at the 2008 World Outdoor Bowls Championship in Christchurch.

After taking part in the 2010 Commonwealth Games and the 2014 Commonwealth Games she was selected as part of the Northern Ireland team for the 2018 Commonwealth Games on the Gold Coast in Queensland.

National
McNally won the 2012 fours title at the Irish National Bowls Championships bowling for the Ballymena Bowls Club. Ten years later in 2022, she won a second national title after winning the triples.

Personal life
She is married to fellow Irish international bowler Gary McCloy and they run the Ballybrakes bowls shop within the Ballybrakes Community Bowls Club.

References

External links 
  (2002, 2006)
 Donna McNally at the Melbourne 2006 Commonwealth Games
  (2010, 2014)
 
 

1972 births
Living people
Female lawn bowls players from Northern Ireland
Bowls players at the 2002 Commonwealth Games
Bowls players at the 2006 Commonwealth Games
Bowls players at the 2010 Commonwealth Games
Bowls players at the 2014 Commonwealth Games
Bowls players at the 2018 Commonwealth Games
Commonwealth Games competitors for Northern Ireland